La Estrella Airport,  is an airport on the southern arm of Rapel Lake, in the O'Higgins Region of Chile.

See also

Transport in Chile
List of airports in Chile

References

External links
OpenStreetMap - La Estrella
OurAirports - La Estrella
FallingRain - La Estrella Airport

Airports in Chile
Airports in O'Higgins Region